Mike Larocca is an American film and television producer. He is currently President and Vice Chairman of the Russo Brothers' AGBO Productions.

Filmography

Films

Miscellaneous crew

Television

References

American film producers
Year of birth missing (living people)
Living people